The 1978 Family Circle Cup was a women's tennis tournament played on outdoor clay courts at the Sea Pines Plantation on Hilton Head Island, South Carolina in the United States. The event was part of the AAA category of the 1978 Colgate Series.  It was the sixth edition of the tournament and was held from April 10 through April 16, 1978. Second-seeded Chris Evert won the singles title and earned $26,000 first-prize money.

Finals

Singles
 Chris Evert defeated  Kerry Reid 6–2, 6–0
 It was Evert's 2nd singles title of the year and the 80th of her career.

Doubles
 Billie Jean King /  Martina Navratilova defeated  Mona Guerrant /  Greer Stevens 6–3, 7–5

Prize money

Notes

References

External links
 ITF tournament edition details
 WTA tournament details 

Family Circle Cup
Family Circle Cup
Family Circle Cup
Family Circle Cup
Charleston Open